We Will Not Harm You is the second studio album by British alternative hip hop musician Dobie, and his first studio album for Big Dada Records. It was released on 19 February 2013.

Cover art
The album's cover art is an original painting by Chris Ofili, who had been friends with Dobie for years before its release.

Recording
In an interview with MTV Hive in 2012, Dobie said, “I suppose it’s just me being brave enough to go where I wanna go, and not trying to follow what everyone else is doing. That was a big thing for me with this album. I was hearing what was going on out there and I was like, ‘I don’t really want to make a record that sounds like that.’" Critics have noted this as a potential influence on the album's eclectic style. Dobie got the idea for the album's title when he heard George Clinton utter it in a Funkadelic documentary. Dobie has also used the phrase to describe the music on the album itself--"It's a bit out there, a bit nutty, but don't be scared of it," he said in a 2013 interview.

Music
The 13 songs on the album are all instrumentals, which differs significantly from the hip hop music Dobie originally became famous for. Instead, the songs on We Will Not Harm You take cues from many disparate genres of music, such as, according to Exclaim!, "Afrobeat, techno, Latin rhythms, jazz and electronica." Artists to whom the album's music has been compared include Flying Lotus and DJ Shadow.

Reception

The album received generally favorable reviews. It holds a 73% rating on Metacritic and a 71% rating on AnyDecentMusic?.

Track listing

References

External links
 

2013 albums
Big Dada albums